Brachodes buxeus is a moth of the family Brachodidae. It is found in the Amanus Mountains, part of the eastern and central Toros Mountains in south-eastern and southern Turkey.

The wingspan is 21.5–27 mm. It is very similar to Brachodes candefactus, but can be distinguished by the wider wingspan, the presence of a developed proboscis, the longer tooth-like processes of the antennal segments and the smaller beige-yellow marking on the hindwing underside. Adults have been recorded on wing in June and the beginning of July.

References

Moths described in 2001
Brachodidae
Insects of Turkey